Little Thornapple River is a  river in Eaton County in the U.S. state of Michigan.

There are few named tributaries. Just north of the Wend Valley Airport, the Little Thornapple is joined by the Densmore Perkins Fish Creek Drain and the Baker Drain.

References 

Rivers of Michigan
Rivers of Eaton County, Michigan
Tributaries of Lake Michigan